The 2015–16 Meralco Bolts season was the 6th season of the franchise in the Philippine Basketball Association (PBA).

Key dates
August 23: The 2015 PBA draft took place in Midtown Atrium, Robinson Place Manila.

Draft picks

Roster

Philippine Cup

Eliminations

Standings

Commissioner's Cup

Eliminations

Standings

Playoffs

Bracket

Governors' Cup

Eliminations

Standings

Bracket

Transactions

Trades 

Off-season

Commissioner's Cup

Recruited imports

References

Meralco Bolts seasons
Meralco